Football Club Kudrivka is a Ukrainian football club based in Kyriivka In Chernihiv Oblast.

History
The club was established in 1982. The club plays in Chernihiv Arena and Yunist Stadium in Chernihiv's city.

Players

Current squad
As of 19 March 2023

Out on loan

Other players under contract

League and cup history
{|class="wikitable"
|-bgcolor="#efefef"
! Season
! Div.
! Pos.
! Pl.
! W
! D
! L
! GS
! GA
! P
!Domestic Cup
!colspan=2|Europe
!Notes
|-
|align=center|2021–22
|align=center|4th Group 2
|align=center|2
|align=center|9
|align=center|7
|align=center|2
|align=center|0
|align=center|26
|align=center|4
|align=center|25
|align=center|
|align=center|
|align=center|
|align=center|
|}

Honours 
Kyiv Oblast Football Federation
   Winners (1): 2020

Kyiv Oblast Football Cup
   Winners (1): 2021

Chernihiv Oblast Football Cup
  Winners (1): 2021

Notable players

  Andriy Porokhnya
  Mykola Syrash
  Dmytro Kulyk
  Roman Vovk
  Myroslav Serdyuk
  Volodymyr Zubashivskyi
  Pavlo Shchedrakov
  Serhiy Datsenko

See also
 Avangard Korukivka

References

External links
 Official website

Media 
Telegram
Facebook
Youtube
Instagram

 
1982 establishments in Ukraine
Association football clubs established in 1982
Football clubs in Chernihiv Oblast